"(We Don't Need This) Fascist Groove Thang" is a song by British synth-pop band Heaven 17. It was their debut single, released on 6 March 1981, also acting as the lead single from their debut studio album, Penthouse and Pavement (1981). It was a minor hit in the UK in 1981, despite being banned by the BBC. It was also a minor dance hit in the US. It developed from an instrumental, "Groove Thang", that Martyn Ware and Ian Craig Marsh created earlier that year for Music for Stowaways, an album they released under the British Electric Foundation name.

Details and ban by the BBC 
"(We Don't Need This) Fascist Groove Thang" was written by Heaven 17 members Martyn Ware, Ian Craig Marsh and Glenn Gregory and included on their 1981 debut album Penthouse and Pavement. It was the first single released by the band.

In the lyrics fascism and racism are described in an ironic fashion, using the lexicon of funk music. The lyrics of the song also reference the UK and US political leaders of the time, Prime Minister Margaret Thatcher and President Ronald Reagan, respectively, and include denunciations of both racism and fascism.
According to the book Banned!: Censorship of Popular Music in Britain, 1967-92, the song was banned by the BBC due to concerns by Radio 1's legal department that it libelled Ronald Reagan as he was the U.S. president at the time of the song's release.

Reception and chart performance 
Despite being banned by the BBC, "(We Don't Need This) Fascist Groove Thang" reached number 45 on the UK singles chart. It debuted on that chart on 21 March 1981 and peaked one week later. The single peaked at number 72 in Australia, and was a minor dance hit in the U.S., reaching number 29 on the Billboard Dance Music/Club Play Singles chart in 1981.
The song was ranked at number 4 among the top 10 "Tracks of the Year" for 1981 by NME. Allmusic reviewer Stewart Mason describes the song as "clattering and jangled", with multiple electronic rhythm tracks played simultaneously, making the song seem faster than its nominal tempo.
"(We Don't Need This) Fascist Groove Thang" has appeared on over a dozen 1980s music and dance music compilations, including Rhino Records' Postpunk Chronicles and Just Can't Get Enough: New Wave Hits of the '80s compilations.

Personnel
Heaven 17:
Glenn Gregory – Vocals
Ian Craig Marsh – Synthesisers
Martyn Ware – Synthesisers, Linn LM-1 and Backing Vocals
with:
Malcolm Veale – Synthesisers
Josie James – Vocals
John Wilson – Bass, rhythm guitar

Remix
A Rapino Brothers remix of "(We Don't Need This) Fascist Groove Thang" was released as a single in 1993, reaching number 40 in the UK Singles Chart. The remix and original version of the song were included on the compilation album Higher and Higher – The Best of Heaven 17, released in the same year.

Cover versions 
Scottish post-punk band The Fire Engines covered the song for a 23 February 1981 Peel session on BBC Radio 1.

German dark wave project Deine Lakaien featured a cover on the 1999 CD Maxi "Into My Arms" (as "(We Don't Need This) Fascist Groove Thing").

American indie rock band Poster Children covered the song on their 2004 EP On the Offensive.

American synth-pop band Information Society covered the song in 2016 for their album  Orders of Magnitude. It was remixed by Inertia and The Crusher for the DEF CON 24 music compilation that same year, featuring multiple voice samples of American president elect Donald Trump.

American post-punk band 100 Flowers covered the song in 2017 for release as a digital single.

American rock band LCD Soundsystem released a cover of the song on 2 November 2018 and included it in their live album Electric Lady Sessions (2019).

Philadelphia punk rock band The Dead Milkmen released a cover August 21, 2020 on a limited-release 7", with proceeds to benefit the charity Girls Rock Philly.

See also 

 Ronald Reagan in music

References 

1981 debut singles
Songs written by Martyn Ware
Songs written by Glenn Gregory
Songs written by Ian Craig Marsh
Songs against racism and xenophobia
Heaven 17 songs
1981 songs
Virgin Records singles
Songs about dancing
Protest songs
Songs about Ronald Reagan
Songs about Margaret Thatcher
Anti-fascist music
Songs banned by the BBC